The Karelian Bear Dog (Karjalankarhukoira) is a Finnish breed of dog. In its home country, it is seen by many as a national treasure. Karelian Bear Dogs will hunt a variety of animals. Its quick reflexes and fearless nature have made it very popular for hunting large game including brown bears, moose, and wild boar. It was the breed's ability to hunt bears that earned the breed its name. The Karelian Bear Dog is among the top 10 most common dog breeds in Finland.

History
The Karelian Bear Dog originated from the Komi dog. Basic stock dogs originated from the Ladoga Karelia, Olonets Karelia, and East Karelia where they were used for hunting. The breeding was started in 1936 to create a sturdy dog which would bark at big game, and named the Karelian Bear Dog. The first standard was established in 1945 and the first dogs were registered in 1946.

The Karelian Bear Dog was used mainly for hunting small fur-bearing animals, such as squirrels and marten. Like the Norwegian Elkhound, the Karelian Bear Dog was also used in hunting moose, lynx, wolf and, as its name would suggest, hunting the Eurasian brown bear. In hunting bear, at least a pair of Bear Dogs would be used to harry the animal, barking loudly, in order to distract the bear while the human hunter came in for the kill.

Karelian Bear Dogs have been used to reduce human-bear conflicts in the U.S., Canada and Japan, through dogs bred by and programs developed and introduced by the Wind River Bear Institute and its Founder Carrie L. Hunt. Larger scale programs have been run by the Institute in coordination with Alberta Parks, Yosemite and Glacier national parks, with Montana Fish, Wildlife and Parks and with the Washington State Department of Fish and Wildlife. Karelian Bear Dogs were introduced in 2004 in Karuizawa, Japan, a popular resort town 170 km northwest of Tokyo, where they reduced the number of bear incidents from 255 in 2006 to four in 2017.

Description
The breed standard for Karelian Bear Dogs and Laikas today calls for a black-and-white marked dog, but originally the breed included individuals with coats of wolf gray of various shades, red coats like the standard spitz, and black-and-tan specimens as well.

Appearance
Both sexes weigh about 20–30 kg (44.1–66 lbs).

The breed has a coat of straight, stiff guard hairs and a fine, soft, thick undercoat.

Temperament

Karelian Bear Dogs are naturally aggressive towards other animals. They typically require deliberate socialization or acculturation with anything the owner is around often. They are very affectionate with their owners, but can be aggressive towards strangers. Proper socialization and training is necessary due to their aggressive disposition. Karelian Bear Dogs are very territorial and will alert their handler to the presence of any strangers or other animals nearby that they do not know.

They are silent but tenacious hunters and alert their handler only when they have the prey at bay. They will keep prey cornered there by barking in a very high, fast bark and running back and forth or around the animal until their handler comes and dispatches it. Karelian Bear Dogs have been known to hold an animal at bay for a very long time. If a bear tries to leave, the dog will nip at it on the backside and otherwise aggravate it to keep it from running away.

They do not always have to hunt with their master, as they can be trained to work with other people. However, they are prone to separation anxiety due to their very social nature. It is very rare for a Karelian Bear Dog to bite a human, but it may kill another animal if it feels threatened or hungry.

They are very social hunting dogs that prefer an outdoor environment, and need plenty of space to run free and get sufficient exercise. In addition, they need a lot of mental and physical stimulation, as this working breed is used to having a job to do. These traits tend to prevent the breed from becoming popular companion dogs.

Related breeds
Finnish Spitz
Norrbottenspets
Russo-European Laika

See also
 Dogs portal
 List of dog breeds
Combai
German Shepherd

Notes

External links

Karelian Bear Dog non-lethal bear control, Washington USA
Viking Dog Breeds
Alaska Science Forum on Bear Dogs
Protection from Bears
Karelian Bear Dog Information by Finnish Spitz Club

Dog breeds originating in Finland
FCI breeds
Hunting dogs
Spitz breeds